The Pride and the Passion is a 1957 Napoleonic-era war film in Technicolor and VistaVision from United Artists, produced and directed by Stanley Kramer, and starring Cary Grant, Frank Sinatra and Sophia Loren. The film co-stars Theodore Bikel and Jay Novello.

The film's storyline concerns a British Royal Navy artillery officer who has orders to retrieve a huge siege cannon from Spain and transport it by ship to British forces. Most of the film deals with the hardships of transporting the cannon to Ávila across rivers and over mountains, while also evading the occupying French forces that have been ordered to find it. A sub-plot concerns the struggle for the love of the Spanish woman Juana (Loren) by the two male protagonists.

The film story and screenplay by Edna Anhalt and Edward Anhalt are loosely based on the 1933 novel The Gun by C. S. Forester. Earl Felton contributed an uncredited screenplay re-write, George Antheil composed the music score, and Saul Bass designed the opening title sequence.

The film's music score was the last important work by George Antheil, once famous as the "bad boy of music" in the 1920s. It is the only one of Antheil's many film scores to have been preserved on a commercial soundtrack recording.

Plot
During the Peninsular War, Napoleon's armies overrun Spain. An enormous siege cannon, belonging to the Spanish army, is abandoned when it slows down the army's retreat. French cavalrymen are dispatched to find it.

Britain, Spain's ally, sends a Royal Navy ordnance officer, Captain Anthony Trumbull, to find the huge cannon and see that it is handed over to British forces before it can be retrieved by the French. However, when Trumbull arrives at the Spanish headquarters, he finds that it has been evacuated and is now occupied by a guerrilla band led by the French-hating Miguel. Miguel shows Trumbull the abandoned cannon's location at the bottom of a steep ravine. He says he will only help move the huge gun if it is first used against the fortified walls of Ávila, which Miguel is obsessed with capturing. During their association, the two men grow to dislike each other. One cause of their enmity is Miguel's mistress, Juana, who falls in love with Trumbull.

Meanwhile, sadistic General Jouvet, the French commander in Ávila, orders the execution of Spanish hostages who will not surrender information on the cannon's whereabouts. The cannon has, in fact, been recovered and undergoes an arduous journey in the direction of Ávila.

The guerrilla band, whose ranks have swelled considerably, almost lose the cannon when General Jouvet deploys artillery at a mountain pass that they must use to get to Ávila. With help from the local populace, the band gets the cannon through, despite heavy losses, although it rolls down a long hillside and is damaged, becoming partially dismounted from its transport carriage.

The cannon is moved and hidden inside a cathedral while it is repaired. Afterwards, it is disguised as an ornamental processional platform during a Catholic Holy Week religious procession to move it past the occupying French. French officers, however, are informed of the cannon's cathedral location, but by the time they arrive, it has been repaired and moved, leaving no trace that it was ever there.

When the cannon finally arrives at the guerrillas' camp on the plains outside Ávila, Trumbull and Miguel prepare to attack the city. However, Ávila is defended by strong walls, eighty cannon and a garrison of French troops. Trumbull explains to the assembled guerilla force that half their number will be killed by various types of French artillery shot and grouped rifle fire during their assault wave. Later, he tries to convince Juana not to participate in the battle, but, the next day, she goes with the men.

Trumbull repeatedly fires the huge siege cannon, its large 96-pound solid shot impacting with 9000 foot-pounds of force, which slowly demolishes Ávila's high southern wall. Despite suffering heavy losses as they charge forward, the guerrillas pour through the city's breached wall and overwhelm the French forces. General Jouvet is killed, and the last French troops are overrun and killed in the town square. After the battle, Trumbull bids farewell to a dying Juana and then places Miguel's dead body at the foot of the statue of Ávila's patron saint Saint Teresa. After securing the huge cannon for its long journey to England, Trumbull leaves Ávila with troubling memories of his adventures across Spain.

Cast
 Cary Grant as Capt. Anthony Trumbull, RN
 Frank Sinatra as Miguel
 Sophia Loren as Juana
 Theodore Bikel as General Jouvet
 John Wengraf as Sermaine
 Jay Novello as Ballinger
 José Nieto as Carlos
 Philip Van Zandt as Colonel Vidal

Production

The film was shot on location in Spain amid persistent rumors that Sinatra took his part only to be near his wife, Ava Gardner, with whom he was having marital problems. Gardner was away from Sinatra for her role in The Sun Also Rises (1957), which was being shot in various locales around Europe, including Spain. When he realized there was to be no reconciliation, Sinatra hurriedly left the production, asking director Stanley Kramer to condense his scenes into a more abbreviated shooting schedule; Kramer obliged. Conversely, Cary Grant was pleased to be away from his troubled marriage to Betsy Drake and pursued a serious romance with co-star Sophia Loren, but Loren went on to marry her mentor and agent Carlo Ponti later that year.

Despite the film's production difficulties, Kramer was nominated by the Directors Guild of America for Outstanding Directorial Achievement.

On March 14, 2011, BBC Radio 4's Afternoon Play broadcast The Gun Goes to Hollywood by Mike Walker, which imagined the behind-the-scenes drama of the Kramer production, including Sinatra leaving the production early and Grant falling in love with co-star Loren. The play was staged from the viewpoint of script doctor Earl Felton, who had been drafted to save the day. The play was directed by Kate McAll, and the cast included Steven Weber as Earl Felton, Greg Itzin as Cary Grant, Kate Steele as Sophia Loren, Jonathan Silverman as Frank Sinatra and Jonathan Getz as Stanley Kramer.

The cannon appears to have been based on the Jaivana Cannon, a real prototype from Jaipur, India, one of the largest cannons ever constructed, which still exists.

The color of Captain Turnbull's naval uniform appears more linked to showing off Technicolor than to any historical depiction of British Navy Blue, which is much darker. This color choice ironically brings his jacket very close to the French enemy's blue uniform color.

Box office and critical reception
Opening to mixed reviews on July 10, 1957, The Pride and The Passion was successful, spurred by the popularity of the leading actors. With US rentals of $3.5 million, from a gross of $8.75 million, and worldwide rentals of $6.7 million, it was one of the 20 highest-grossing films of 1957. However, high production costs caused the film to lose $2.5 million.

Variety praised the film's production values, saying "Top credit must go to the production. The panoramic, long-range views of the marching and terribly burdened army, the painful fight to keep the gun mobile through ravine and over waterway – these are major pluses."

Author Ephraim Katz described the film as "overblown empty epic nonsense."

Comic book adaptation
 Dell Four Color #824 (August 1957)

See also
 Jaivana Cannon
 List of American films of 1957
 Tsar Cannon
 List of the largest cannon by caliber

References

External links
 
 
 
 
 Variety's Review
 BBC Radio 4's The Afternoon Play – The Gun Goes to Hollywood

1957 films
1950s war drama films
1957 drama films
American war drama films
1950s English-language films
Peninsular War films
Films based on British novels
Films set in the 1810s
Films set in Spain
Films shot in Madrid
United Artists films
Films produced by Stanley Kramer
Films directed by Stanley Kramer
Films scored by George Antheil
Films adapted into comics
Films shot in the province of Ávila
Films with screenplays by Edward Anhalt
Films with screenplays by Edna Anhalt
Films based on works by C. S. Forester
Guerrilla warfare in film
1950s American films